Carrefour is a French multinational retail and wholesaling corporation headquartered in Massy, France. The eighth-largest retailer in the world by revenue, it operates a chain of hypermarkets, groceries stores and convenience stores, which as of December 2021, comprises 13,894 stores in over 30 countries.

History
The first Carrefour shop (not a hypermarket) opened in 1960, within suburban Annecy, near a crossroads (hence the name, carrefour means crossroads in French). The group was created in 1958 by Marcel Fournier, Denis Defforey and Jacques Defforey, who attended and were influenced by several seminars in the United States led by "the Pope of retail" Bernardo Trujillo.

The Carrefour group was the first in Europe to open a hypermarket, a large supermarket, and a department store under the same roof. They opened their first hypermarket on 15 June 1963 in Sainte-Geneviève-des-Bois, near Paris.

In April 1976, Carrefour launched a private label Produits libres (free products – libre meaning free in the sense of liberty as opposed to gratis) line of fifty foodstuffs, including oil, biscuits (crackers and cookies), milk, and pasta, sold in unbranded white packages at substantially lower prices.

In 1999, it merged with Promodès, better known through its retail banners Continent (hypermarkets) or Champion (supermarkets), one of its major competitors in the French market.

In September 2009, Carrefour updated its logo.

In May 2011, Carrefour reviewed its business situation under conditions of stagnant growth and increasing competition in France from rivals including Casino Guichard-Perrachon SA, and decided to invest €1.5  billion ($2.22  billion) to introduce the supermarket concept of Carrefour Planet in Western Europe.

In April 2015, Brazilian businessman Abílio Diniz revealed he was in talks to raise his 5.07 per cent stake in Carrefour and has the support of shareholders to take a board seat.

On 9 June 2017, the board of directors chose Alexandre Bompard as the new chairman and chief executive officer of Carrefour with effect as of 18 July 2017.

In 2017, Carrefour began working with a small French start-up, Expliceat, on a trial basis. Expliceat built a commercial mill that is designed to crumb down leftover bread. It rents the mill to commercial bakeries and then uses the crumb to bake cookies, muffins and pancakes.

In January 2018, Alexandre Bompard announced a strategic plan for the company, entitled "Carrefour 2022", that seeks to make Carrefour the "leader of the food transition for all". The plan includes measures for better food and package sustainability, limitation of food waste, development of organic products, e-commerce partnerships, and two billion euros in annual investments from 2018 as well as organisational and cost reduction measures.

In the exceptional context of the COVID-19 pandemic, Carrefour is the first retailer to join C'est qui le Patron ? initiative to share its additional incomes related to COVID-19 to support people who are suffering from the current situation. According to co-founder Nicolas Chabanne, 100,000 euros have been paid out, then 50,000 euros each week until 11 May.

Carrefour's Board of Directors has decided to reduce by 50% the dividend proposed for 2019. The dividend is now €0.69 per share (versus €0.46 per share).

Until the end of the year, Alexandre Bompard and all the members of Carrefour Group's board of directors have decided to waive 25% of their director's fees. These savings will be used to finance solidarity actions for the company's employees, both in France and abroad.

Alexandre Bompard has decided to waive 25% of his fixed salary for a period of two months. To express his gratitude to his personnel in the field, he has decided to offer an exceptional bonus of €1,000 net to 85,000 employees in France.

Financial data

Domestic operations 

The headquarters of the Groupe Carrefour is in Massy in the Paris metropolitan area. This major location gathers since 2019 the former Carrefour head office of Boulogne-Billancourt and the Carrefour France division office of Courcouronnes, Essonne, France, near Évry. A secondary head office is located in Mondeville, near Caen (Normandy), which was until 1999 the former Promodès headquarters.

In France, Carrefour operates under its name over 230 hypermarkets (from 2500 up to 23000 sq m sales area), 1020 Carrefour Market supermarkets (generally from 1000 up to 4000 sq m), and over 2000 smaller supermarkets and convenience stores under the Carrefour City, Carrefour Contact and Carrefour Express banners.

Carrefour also owns the Promocash Cash&Carry chain (130 locations) and supplies 1500 independent small food stores under the Proxi banner. It has recently acquired the organic food chains SoBio and Bio C'Bon to boost its presence in this promising segment.

In 2019, the group launched its first Supeco soft discount stores, which are so far all located in the French Northern region Hauts-de-France. The concept is still being assessed.

International operations

Africa

Egypt
Carrefour has 44 outlets under franchise in Egypt, which are generally situated in shopping malls and frequented by the Egyptian upper class. The location in Alexandria was severely looted during the Egyptian Revolution of 2011. Opened Hypermarkets: (Maadi City Center, Dandy Mega Mall, Sun City Mall, Obour Golf City Mall, Alex City Center, Cairo Festival City, Sky Plaza (El-Shorouk City), Mall of Egypt). Opened Express Markets: (Maadi, Tiba Outlet Mall, Sharm-El-Sheik, Green Plaza Mall, Down Town Mall).

Kenya
Carrefour has 13 outlets  in Kenya, largely located in the suburbs of Nairobi. The retailer's expansion into Kenya has benefited from the failure of previously-dominant supermarket chains such as Nakumatt and Uchumi as Carrefour rushed in to occupy the retail spaces and market share they vacated.

The retailer is the anchor client of The Hub Karen Mall where it opened its first Kenyan store in May 2016. A second outlet was opened at Two Rivers Mall in March 2017, soon followed by a third store the Thika Road Mall in November 2017. The fourth outlet was opened at the Junction Mall along Ngong Road in January 2018; the fifth at Sarit Center in April 2018; and the sixth at Galleria Mall in June 2018. In May 2018, Carrefour announced that plans were underway to open a seventh branch at The Village Market as its first Carrefour Market focused predominantly on food items over non-food items. In June 2020, Carrefour opened a new store along Uhuru Highway.

In September 2020, Carrefour announced plans to continue its expansion efforts by opening three branches in the coastal city of Mombasa. In May 2021 it opened another branch of Carrefour Market in Garden City Mall along the Thika superhighway. It also has a branch at Westgate Mall previously occupied by ShopRite.

Morocco
Carrefour has 10 hypermarkets in Morocco, with the majority being located in and around the Casablanca metropolitan area. Carrefour Maroc is a partner of LabelVie, a Moroccan supermarket chain. All LabelVie stores were transformed into Carrefour Markets. There are 30 of them spread around the country. Carrefour is still expanding its presence in Morocco by opening more supermarkets and hypermarkets to face settled competition such as the Moroccan hypermarket chain Marjane.

Tunisia
Carrefour has two hypermarkets and 70 outlets under MAF in Tunisia.

Uganda
Carrefour operates two stores in the Ugandan capital city of Kampala. The outlets are the anchor clients at Oasis Mall and Metroplex mall and are in spaces previously occupied by the Kenyan retail chain Nakumatt.

In September 2021 Carrefour signed an agreement with Shoprite of South Africa for the former to take over six stores that the latter was vacating in Uganda, no later than 31 December 2021. This will increase Carrefour's presence in the country from two stores to eight outlets.

East and South Asia

Mainland China

In 2007, expansion accelerated outside France, particularly in Asia, with the building of 36 new hypermarkets, including 22 in China, where the group broke its record for store openings in a one-year period. It was the leading foreign retailer in terms of sales figures until 2008, and has since lost its No. 1 position to RT-Mart. A selection of Carrefour products are sold in Hong Kong via Wellcome and its sister Market Place by Jasons.

In 2019, Carrefour sold 80% equity of Carrefour China to local retail conglomerate Suning.com at €620 million.

Pakistan
In 2009, Carrefour opened its first hypermarket in Lahore under the name of Hyperstar in a joint venture with Majid Al Futtaim Group, where it achieved  in revenues in its first year. It attracted more than 1 million customers every month. On 14 November 2011, Hyperstar opened its second hypermarket in the country in Karachi. On 22 March 2016, it expanded its operations to Islamabad by opening a  hypermarket in World Trade Center Islamabad.

Since 20 December 2018, MAF has rebranded Hyperstar to Carrefour across Pakistan. It has plans to expand its stores to other cities including Gujranwala, Multan and Hyderabad. As of June 2019, the group had already invested  and was looking to invest another  in Pakistan. It is operating at least seven hypermarkets (three in Lahore, two in Karachi, one in Islamabad and one in Faisalabad's Lyallpur Galleria) and one superstore in Pakistan.

Taiwan
In 1989, Carrefour became the first international retailer to establish a presence in Asia when it entered Taiwan through a joint venture with Uni President Enterprises Corporation. It leveraged the experience it gathered in Taiwan to expand into other Asian markets.

In 2020, Carrefour Taiwan announced they would acquire 199 Wellcome and 25 Jasons Market Place stores from Dairy Farm International.

In 2022, Carrefour announced that it sold 60% equity of Carrefour Taiwan to Uni-President Enterprises Corporation.

Europe (outside France)

Albania
In November 2011, Carrefour opened its first store in Albania as part of the TEG Shopping Center (Tirana East Gate) with the same rights as in the European Union and throughout the rest of Europe. Carrefour is integrated into the new shopping centre in the same format as in other countries, extending into a space of about 7000 square meters. Carrefour has a policy of supplying imported products while promoting Albanian products, particularly agro-industrial ones.

Belgium
Carrefour began its internationalisation in Belgium in 1969 through the formation of a strategic alliance with the GB Group. Between 1970 and 2000 several formats were tried with multiple brands and names used by Carrefour GB. In 2000 the Carrefour Group took over GB and Carrefour Belgium was officially born. The company retained the GB brand for some outlets as late as 2007, when all Carrefour stores were united under the Carrefour name, operated as Carrefour and Carrefour Express GB. In May 2008, EcoPlanet Carrefour launched, selling gas and green energy throughout Belgium. In 2009 Carrefour Hyper, GB Carrefour, Carrefour Market and Carrefour Express outlets were established and online shopping was launched. In February 2010 Carrefour announced the elimination of 1,672 jobs and the closure of 21 stores, and the possibility of the acquisition of 20 stores by the group Mestdagh, its main franchise partner in Belgium.

Georgia
Carrefour operates three hypermarkets and 53 Carrefour markets in Georgia. It opened its first hypermarket in Georgia at Tbilisi Mall on 13 September 2012, occupying approximately 12,000 sq m. The first market was opened at Karvasla Malon on 16 September 2013. In 2014, the second Carrefour market was opened at Shopping Mall GTC on Orbeliani Square. On 10 November 2015, Carrefour opened its second hypermarket at East Point shopping mall. Shortly after the opening, Carrefour opened its third market in the Isani district of Tbilisi. In 2016, Carrefour opened its fourth market in City Mall Gldani. The latest markets were opened in the Saburtalo, Vake, Gldani and Vazisubani neighbourhoods of Tbilisi and in Batumi.

Greece
In 1999, Carrefour entered the Greek market in collaboration with Marinopoulos S.A. Carrefour stopped operating in Greece in 2017 due to its acquisition by the Sklavenitis group. The company reopened in the country in May 2022, and the reactivation of the Carrefour brand in the market will be done in collaboration with Retail & more S.A., a subsidiary of the Teleunicom group.

Italy
Carrefour's presence in Italy is mainly due to its merger with Promodès, which operated hypermarkets, supermarkets and convenience stores. Carrefour is considered the fifth-largest retailer in Italy, including franchise stores.

Poland
Carrefour opened its first hypermarket in Poland in 1997. Currently the group operates around 90 hypermarkets in Poland, as well as Carrefour Market and Carrefour Express stores.

Romania
In 2001, Carrefour entered the Romanian market, expanded into 43 stores. It is one of the top retailers in Romania.

Spain
Spain is the third-largest international market for Carrefour after France and Brazil. Carrefour has 205 hypermarkets, 112 Carrefour Markets and more than 820 Carrefour Express in Spain as well as 143 petrol stations, 426 travel agencies and other smaller Carrefour retailers. There are as well more hypermarkets and supermarkets under construction or planned. The company operates in Spain under the name of Centros Comerciales Carrefour SA. As of 2019, Carrefour Spain is the 15th most important Spanish company by revenue. Its rivals in Spain are: Mercadona, Eroski, Alcampo and Bonpreu.

Middle East
Majid Al Futtaim has handled the Carrefour operations in the Middle East and North Africa region since 1995, as the company opened the region's first hypermarket at City Centre Deira – it initially was a Continent-branded store before it converted to Carrefour four years later. As of 2020, Majid Al Futtaim operates over 320 Carrefour stores in 16 countries, serving more than 750,000 customers daily and employing over 37,000 workers.

Armenia
Carrefour opened its first hypermarket in Armenia at Yerevan Mall on 11 March 2015, occupying approximately 10,000 square meters. As of March 2022, Carrefour operates a total of seven stores in Armenia, all located in the Yerevan area. Six of these stores are in the Carrefour Market format, in addition to the original hypermarket in Yerevan Mall.

Bahrain
Majid Al Futtaim opened Carrefour's first Bahrain store in the City Centre Bahrain in 2008.

Iran
In February 2009, MAF opened its first store in Iran, called HyperStar in the Western region of Tehran. It opened its second store in Iran in April 2012. This store is located in Persian Gulf Complex. It opened its third store in Isfahan located in Isfahan City Center in 2012. Three other stores are to be opened in the Eastern region of Tehran, Mashhad and Tabriz.

Iraq
Majid al Futtaim opened the first Carrefour in Erbil in 2011. There is also a Family Mall Carrefour Department store in Sulaymaniyah.

Israel
In 2022, Carrefour announced that more than 150 branches will be opened in Israel. The Yeinot Bitan and Mega Ba'ir Israeli grocery chains will gradually be converted into Carrefour branches, with the first branches under the Carrefour brand opening near the end of 2022.

Jordan
Also operated by Majid al Futtaim, Carrefour is very popular in Jordan, with dozens of locations dotting the capital and the suburbs. The largest and most frequented is Carrefour: City Mall in the suburb of Dabuk. Another multi-story complex is scheduled to open near the Sixth Circle. Carrefour Express are smaller-sized stores that operate inside smaller shopping areas, such as the as Carrefour Express: Swéfiéh Avenue inside the Avenue Mall in Sweifieh.

Kuwait
In March 2007, Carrefour opened a store in Kuwait in the Avenues mall.

Lebanon
On 4 April 2013, Majid al Futtaim inaugurated a Carrefour hypermarket at their City Centre Beirut mall, in the Hazmieh suburb of Beirut. In September 2017, a second Carrefour outlet opened at the CityMall Dora, replacing a venue formerly held by a Monop' hypermarket. In June 2018, a third outlet opened at the Tower Center mall in Zouk Mosbeh. In February 2019, a fourth Carrefour, and the first supermarket format venue, opened within the Aley District. The fourth Carrefour is considered a major step for the company's expansion in Lebanon.

Oman
In Oman, Carrefour opened a store in 2001 on the outskirts of Muscat. In 2008, another branch opened in Qurum. In May 2011 Carrefour opened a store in Sohar. The fourth Carrefour opened in March 2012 at Muscat Grand Mall. The fifth branch opened in Salalah on 24 May 2013. As of 2021, Carrefour operates twelve hypermarkets and three supermarkets in Oman.

Saudi Arabia
Carrefour has 18 franchise-operated hypermarkets in Saudi Arabia, with 7 of them in Riyadh.

Turkey
Carrefour opened its first store in 1993 in Ataşehir. It has 754 stores in 40 provinces. Carrefour also operates in Turkey in a joint venture with Sabancı Group under the name CarrefourSA.

United Arab Emirates
Carrefour operates in the United Arab Emirates under Majid al Futtaim. The country's first Carrefour hypermarket at City Centre Deira opened in 1995.

On 1 March 2022, Carrefour opened in City Centre Me'aisem in Dubai its first Bio store.

South America

Argentina
Around 605 stores are in operation in Argentina .

Brazil
Carrefour Brasil, the largest market outside France, was founded in 1975 and today is the major supermarket chain in Brazil in competition with Grupo Pão de Açúcar. Currently it sells more than 25 million products per year.

Former stores
 Austria – In 1976 Carrefour opened a store in the Shopping City Süd at the southern edge of Vienna. Due to limited success, the store closed soon after. Carrefour has not made any other attempt at entering the Austrian market after that.
 Bulgaria – From 2009 to 2011 Bulgaria opened eight locations (five hypermarkets and three supermarkets) in Sofia, Plovdiv, Pleven, Varna, Burgas and Ruse. In 2010, Carrefour and Marinopoulos Group, the largest retail group in Greece, established a franchise company MSC Bulgaria to develop hypermarkets and supermarkets under the Carrefour banner within Southeastern Europe. In June 2016 the owner of the franchise for Bulgaria declared bankruptcy and the stores were closed.
 Chile – Carrefour opened six supermarkets in Santiago de Chile between 1998 and 2003. However, Carrefour never surpassed a 3% market share in the country and their assets in Chile were sold to D&S in 2003.
 Colombia – In October 2012, Carrefour sold all 72 stores in Colombia to Chilean retailer Cencosud for $2.6  billion, with Cencosud converting all existing Carrefour hypermarkets to its Jumbo brand. Carrefour pulled out of Colombia to focus on its core markets.
 Cyprus – In 2017, all of the Carrefour stores were sold to a Greek supermarket brand Sklavenitis and underwent a major rebranding, to reflect the brand that now owns the stores.
 Czech Republic – In September 2005, Carrefour sold eleven stores in the Czech Republic to Tesco, the largest UK retailer. Tesco paid €57.4  million as well as its stores in Taiwan. Carrefour opened its first store in 1998 in the Czech Republic. The stores use the Tesco name and brand now.
 Germany – The only store in Germany was opened in 1977 in Mainz-Bretzenheim as a joint venture with Delhaize le Lion and German retailer Stüssgen (later part of REWE Group). Due to problems with a new building permit process and the associated difficulties in opening new locations, the store was sold in 1979 to the German retailer Massa.
 Hong Kong – On 18 September 2000, Carrefour closed its stores in Hong Kong after complaints from manufacturers about selling products (especially electronics) at prices far below those of its competitors. A company spokesman said at that time that the closures were due to "difficulties in finding sites suitable for developing its hypermarket concept and quickly acquiring a significant market share". Carrefour entered the Hong Kong market in December 1996 with a store in Heng Fa Chuen and later added stores in Tsuen Wan (Skyline Plaza), Tuen Mun, Yuen Long and Tsim Sha Tsui. Plans to open additional stores in Ma On Shan, Tseung Kwan O and Yau Tsim Mong had been cancelled.
 India – Carrefour operated cash and carry stores in India under the name Carrefour Wholesale Cash & Carry. The first store opened on 30 December 2010 in Shahdara, Delhi. This was followed by a store in Jaipur in late 2011 and one in Meerut in October 2012, Agra in December 2013. Prior to September 2012, India's foreign direct investment (FDI) policy did not allow foreign companies to open multi-brand retail stores in the country. However, 100% FDI in cash-and-carry has been permitted since 1997. As a result, most global retailers, including Carrefour, opted for the cash-and-carry route in India. A new FDI policy, allowing up to 51% FDI in multi-brand retail, came into effect on 20 September 2012. On 8 July 2014, Carrefour announced that it would shut down its Indian operations and close its five wholesale stores by the end of September.
 Indonesia – The first Carrefour branch in Indonesia opened in 14 October 1998 in Cempaka Putih region of Jakarta, following the end of 1997 Asian financial crisis and the subsequent fall of Suharto. In 2012, after operating independently, Carrefour Indonesia was bought by CT Corp and its shares are owned by Chairul Tanjung. CT Corp developed Transmart in 2014, a subsidiary of CT Corp operated by PT Trans Retail Indonesia (formerly PT Carrefour Indonesia, PT Contimas Utama Indonesia, PT Cartisa Properti Indonesia and PT Carti Satria Megaswalayan) and named after CT Corp's television networks Trans TV. It also developed Groserindo, a grocery store also largely operated by Carrefour. Carrefour officially left the nation in 2020, and CT Corp rebranded all remaining branches as Transmart.
 Japan – In 1999 Carrefour's Japanese subsidiary, Carrefour Japan Co. Ltd., opened. The first Carrefour in Japan opened in a suburb of Tokyo in December 2000. In January and February 2001 new Carrefour stores opened in Tokyo and Osaka. Sales were initially strong, but, as Miki Tanikawa of The New York Times wrote, "...10 months later, there is barely a line for most of the day at cash registers of most Carrefour stores here. Lengthy aisles of goods ranging from clothes to bicycles are mostly empty." In early 2003, Carrefour sold its 8 hypermarkets to AEON Group and on 10 March 2005, the subsidiary's name changed to AEON Marche´ Co., Ltd. The stores were still operated in the Carrefour name until 31 March 2010, when the license expired. 
 Kazakhstan – In the summer of 2017, the one and only Carrefour hypermarket closed down in Almaty as a result of the loss of value of the Tenge currency.
 Malaysia – Carrefour entered Malaysia in 1994 and sold its 26 hypermarkets to AEON Group in November 2012. The hypermarkets was rebranded as AEON BIG, and operates with an orange logo, compared to the magenta logo used by its parent company and existing JUSCO stores in the country. The outlets in Kota Damansara and Jalan Ipoh were the first to be changed from Carrefour to AEON BIG;
 Mexico – In March 2005, Carrefour sold its 29 hypermarkets in Mexico to Chedraui. Carrefour opened its first store in 1994 in Mexico;
North Macedonia – In October 2012, Carrefour opened its first store in Skopje. The store was part of the brand City Mall that opened the same day in Skopje. By the end of summer 2014, there were plans to open the second store in Tetovo. Carrefour shut down operations in North Macedonia because of debt.
 Portugal – Carrefour entered Portugal by buying its first stores in 1991 – two Euromarché hypermarkets in Telheiras (a neighbourhood of Lisbon) and Vila Nova de Gaia. In July 2007 Carrefour sold all of its 12 hypermarkets and 9 fuel stations to Sonae for €662  million. Also included were 11 licenses for opening new commercial spaces. Currently, only 365 hard-discount supermarkets such as Minipreço are supported by Carrefour in Portugal, not included in the takeover.
 Russia – Carrefour entered the Russian market in the summer of 2009. In October 2009, only a month after it opened its second hypermarket in the country, Carrefour announced it was exiting Russia.
 Singapore – In 2012, Carrefour's stores were primarily replaced by Giant Hyper (Suntec City) and Cold Storage.
 Slovakia – In 2018, Carrefour pulled out of the Slovak market, after 17 years of operation in the country.
 South Korea – Carrefour entered the Korean market in 1996 with their first store in Bucheon and operated 32 stores across the country at its peak in its final year, 2006. Carrefour was confident they would dominate the market, and by 1999 invested a total of $925 million USD into the Korean venture – more than any other foreign company in the Korean market at that time. Carrefour Korea enjoyed mediating success initially, gaining traction for unseen low prices and standing above its competitors. But the rise quickly ended when the Asian Financial Crisis struck South Korea in late 1997. Carrefour's reputation suffered a blow when they were exposed smuggling real estate in South Korea to international recipients. Alongside the reluctance of people spending in the midst of the financial crisis, boycotts ensued, beginning Carrefour's eventual demise. Complaints of Carrefour Korea's poor service quality grew, citing pushing products unfit for the Korean market and significantly soured relationships between the executives and the labour unions. With the company's attitude becoming reckless to its clients and suppliers, clients would boycott again while suppliers began refusing association with Carrefour Korea. With the company stained with controversial negativity, Carrefour Korea sold all their stores to E-Land and exited the Korean market in April 2006. Shortly after, E-Land sold their supermarket asset to Homeplus, recognized as Carrefour Korea's spiritual successor.
 Switzerland – In August 2007 Carrefour sold its 12 hypermarkets in Switzerland to Swiss retailer Coop for $390  million;
 Syria – Carrefour previously opened a store in Shahba Mall in Aleppo in 2009 and operated until the mall was destroyed during the Syrian Civil War on 16 October 2014 when the mall was destroyed and permanently closed.
 Thailand – Carrefour's business in Thailand was sold to Big C Supercenter Public Company Limited, the owner of Big C hypermarket stores in Thailand, due to complaints. The transaction was completed in March 2011, with the Suwinthawong branch being the first store converted from Carrefour to Big C. Carrefour entered the Thai market in 1996.
 United Kingdom – Carrefour opened the first of several hypermarkets in the UK in September 1972 in Caerphilly, South Wales, in a joint partnership with a UK company Wheatsheaf/Hypermarket Holdings, followed by stores at the Telford Centre, Chandler's Ford, Minworth, Patchway and Swindon. The Dee Corporation later acquired the stores in the early 1980s; they continued to trade under the Carrefour name, while some other existing smaller sites were rebranded as Carrefour. In the 1980s, new stores were opened at the MetroCentre in Tyne and Wear, and the Merry Hill Shopping Centre in the West Midlands, before being rebranded under the now-defunct Gateway chain in 1988.  In 1990, the stores were sold to Asda.  The initial Caerphilly store was redeveloped in the 1990s; however, the original 1970s hypermarkets at Chandler's Ford, Minworth and Patchway (Cribbs Causeway) still exist as large Asda Supercentres. Since July 2011, online supermarket Ocado has sold a range of Carrefour products in the UK.
 United States – Carrefour opened its first hypermarket in the United States in Philadelphia, Pennsylvania, in March 1988, across from the Franklin Mills shopping mall (now Philadelphia Mills). Despite the large selection, the store was generally derided for its poor conditions, and most of the time, many of the 61 checkout lanes in the store were deserted. In 1992, another location opened in Voorhees Township, New Jersey. Both stores closed because of financial debt in 1993. The Voorhees store was broken up into many smaller stores, while the Philadelphia location became a Walmart and a Dick's Sporting Goods.
 Vietnam – Carrefour had two stores at Ho Chi Minh City until 2004. The stores were later converted into Lotte Mart branches.

Carrefour Foundation
The Carrefour Foundation (Fondation d'Enterprise Carrefour) is a philanthropic fund created by Carrefour in 2000 to support social welfare programmes 'linked to [its] core business as a retailer' in countries the company operates and in countries where its suppliers are located.

Criticism and controversies

On 1 May 2007, more than 30 employees of the now-closed Carrefour Ratu Plaza, Jakarta, Indonesia, were taken to the Pertamina Central Hospital after being affected by carbon monoxide. The hypermarket was located in the mall's basement, which offered insufficient ventilation.

On 26 June 2007, the company was convicted in a French court for false advertising. The suit alleged that Carrefour regularly stocked insufficient quantities of advertised products for sale. In addition, the company was convicted of selling products below cost and accepting kickbacks from wholesalers. Carrefour was ordered to pay a fine of €2  million and to prominently and legibly display a notice in all of its French stores disclosing the false advertising.

In Carrefour Mangga Dua Square in Jakarta, Indonesia, a 5-metre high metal rack fell on top of a 3-year-old boy, killing him almost instantly due to internal bleeding. Afterwards, the victim's family claimed that Carrefour has refused to meet with them to settle the case. However, a Carrefour Corporate Affairs Officer denied this allegation.

Carrefour has also received criticism for engaging in sweatshop practices.

On 7 May 2009, the French government asked a tribunal to fine Carrefour some €220,000 for more than 2,500 violations. Meat products lacked proper tracking information (more than 25% of inventory at some locations), and some products had incorrect labels – such as meat products that "shrank" in weight by 15% after receiving labels. The chain sold products that had long since passed their expiration dates, including, in one case, packs of baby formula that had expired six months earlier. Some 1,625 frozen and refrigerated products were found that had been stored in warehouses at ambient temperatures.

Boycott of supplies in China

In April 2008, after the 2008 Olympic torch relay was disrupted by Tibetan independence movement advocates in London and especially in Paris, where some protesters attempted to wrest control of the torch from the torch bearers, Chinese activists promoted boycotting Carrefour because of unsubstantiated rumours that the company gave funds to Tibetan independence groups and the Dalai Lama. In its response, Carrefour China stated that it did support the Beijing Olympics; and that it would never do anything to harm the feelings of the Chinese people. Protests and calls for the boycott later subsided, partly because of efforts by French officials to apologize for the Paris torch attack.

Building collapse at Savar

On 24 April 2013, the eight-story Rana Plaza commercial building collapsed in Savar, a sub-district near Dhaka, the capital of Bangladesh. At least 1,127 people died and over 2,438 were injured. The factory housed a number of separate garment factories employing around 5,000 people, several shops, and a bank and manufactured apparel for brands including the Benetton Group, Joe Fresh, The Children's Place, Primark, Monsoon, and DressBarn. Of the 29 brands identified as having sourced products from the Rana Plaza factories, only 9 attended meetings held in November 2013 to agree a proposal on compensation to the victims. Several companies refused to sign, including Walmart, Carrefour, Bonmarché, Mango, Auchan and KiK. The agreement was signed by Primark, Loblaw, Bonmarche and El Corte Ingles.

Slavery in Thailand
In 2014, The Guardian reported that Carrefour is a client of Charoen Pokphand Foods. During a six-month investigation, The Guardian traced the entire supply chain from slave ships in Asian waters to leading producers and retailers.

Deaths in Brazil
On 28 November 2018, a mixed-breed dog named Manchinha was poisoned and later beaten to death with an aluminum bar by one of the security guards at a Carrefour store in the city of Osasco, São Paulo. The episode, known as Caso Manchinha, sparked a series of protests led by activists in front of the Osasco store in December 2018, and also inspired the creation of bill PL 1.095/2019, which was later approved by the executive and turned into a federal law in September 2020, imposing harsher penalties to crimes related to animal abuse.

In 2020, two death-related incidents were reported in Brazil. The first one happened in August when a sales representative died of a heart attack. To allow the store to continue operating, other workers hid his body in a barricade made out of umbrellas and cardboard boxes.

On 19 November 2020, one day before the Brazilian holiday Black Awareness Day, a 40-year-old black man named João Alberto Silveira Freitas was killed by security guards after an altercation with a cashier. After an alleged "violent gesture" to one of the cashiers, two security guards were called, proceeded to drag the man out of the store and beat him to death in the parking lot. Both security guards were arrested and charged with qualified homicide.

Deforestation in Amazonia 
According to Mighty Earth, Carrefour is not  respecting its commitments to fight deforestation in the Amazon rainforest. In a report at the occasion of the 2022 World Amazon Day, Mighty Earth published a statement criticising the retail group for sourcing from "meat and soy traders with devastating practices." The organisation points to the group's activities in Brazil where, with its 1,000 sales outlets, Carrefour controls 25% of the food distribution market. The NGO found that two-thirds of the 102 meat products inspected in Carrefour stores in Brazil are supplied by JBS, which is "regularly targeted for deforestation cases", according to Mighty Earth. Following the report publication,  Carrefour suspended beef supplies from two JBS slaughterhouses in the Amazon.

Stabbing in Italy

On the 27th of October 2022, a man grabbed a knife from a supermarket shelf in Milan, stabbing five people, killing one and wounding four others, including Spanish soccer player Pablo Mari, Italian authorities said.

Police arrested a 46-year-old Italian man suspected in the attack at a shopping centre in Assago (a town near Milan).

Notes

See also
 Companies of France
 European Retail Round Table
 List of companies of France
 List of hypermarkets
 Carrefour Marinopoulos

References

External links

 
 Yahoo! – Carrefour SA Company Profile
 The history-book of Yves Soulabail, Carrefour Un combat pour la liberté, Le Loup Hurlant Editions, 2010.

 
1970s initial public offerings
CAC 40
Companies based in Île-de-France
Companies listed on Euronext Paris
French brands
French business families
French companies established in 1958
Hypermarkets of France
Multinational companies headquartered in France
Retail companies established in 1958
Retail companies of France
Supermarkets of France
Wholesalers of France